John Patrick Hannan is an Irish prison fugitive who holds the record for the longest escape from custody. In December 1955, Hannan escaped Verne Prison, located on the Isle of Portland, along with his fellow inmate Gwynant Thomas. Thomas was later returned to the prison, but Hannon has been on the run for over sixty years. In 2001, Hannan overtook double killer Leonard Fristoe's record of 45 years and 11 months as a fugitive. In 1998, Dorset Police appealed directly to Hannan to give himself up, writing in a force newsletter: "If you read this Mr. Hannan please write in, we'd love to hear from you."

Escaping the Verne
Hannan was sentenced to 21 months behind bars for stealing a car and assaulting two police officers, but he broke out from the facility with fellow inmate Gwynant Thomas after just 30 days by using a knotted bed sheet to climb over the wall. After escaping, they then burgled a nearby gas station and stole overcoats, beer and cigarettes before leaving the isle. Thomas, who was also 22, was detained and returned to the prison within 16 hours after being spotted by a truck driver.

See also
 Prison escape
 List of prison escapes

References

1933 births
Fugitives wanted on robbery charges
Irish prisoners and detainees
Living people